Sage or SAGE may refer to:

Plants
 Salvia officinalis, common sage, a small evergreen subshrub used as a culinary herb
 Lamiaceae, a family of flowering plants commonly known as the mint or deadnettle or sage family
 Salvia, a large genus commonly referred to as sage, containing the common sage
 Leucophyllum, a genus of evergreen shrubs in the figwort family, often called sages
 Artemisia (plant), a genus of shrubs in the composite family, includes several members referred to as sage or sagebrush

Arts, entertainment and media

Fictional characters 
 Sage (comics), in Marvel comics
 Sage (Dark Oracle), in the Canadian TV series
 Sage, in the TV show Hot Wheels Battle Force 5
 Sage, a Shuffle! character
 Sage, in The Vampire Diaries (season 3)
 Sage the Owl, in The Herbs
 The Sage, in the Groo the Wanderer comics
 Sages, characters of The Legend of Zelda
 Toad Sage and the Sage of the Six Paths, Naruto characters
 Sage, a living tumbleweed in The SpongeBob Movie: Sponge on the Run
 Sage, in Sonic Frontiers

Other uses in arts, entertainment and media
 Sage writing, a form of literary non-fiction popular in the Victorian era
 SAGE (journal) or Sage: A Scholarly Journal on Black Women, an academic journal 
 Sage Gateshead, an entertainment venue in Gateshead, England
 Sonic Amateur Games Expo (SAGE), an event which takes place each year that demonstrates Sonic the Hedgehog fan-games

Businesses and organizations

Education
 The Sage Colleges, in New York, U.S.
 The Sage School, in Foxboro, Massachusetts, U.S.
 Sage University, in Indore, Madhya Pradesh, India

Businesses
 Frederick Sage & Company, a British interior design company, which later extended into aircraft manufacturing
 SAGE Computer Technology, an American computer manufacturer, later named Stride
 Sage Group, a British multinational enterprise software company
 SAGE Publishing, an American publishing company
 Sage Telecom, an American telecommunications company
 SAGE Electrochromics, an American glass development company

Other organizations
 Services & Advocacy for GLBT Elders (SAGE), an American non-profit organization
 Strategic Advisory Group of Experts (SAGE), a body advising World Health Organization
 Scientific Advisory Group for Emergencies (SAGE), a British government advisory body
 Swedish Agency for Government Employers, a Swedish administrative authority 
 SAGE (organization), now LISA, the USENIX special interest group for system administrators
 SAGE-AU, an Australian professional association of system administrators
 Sage Bionetworks, an American  nonprofit organization
 Society of American Gastrointestinal and Endoscopic Surgeons (SAGES), an American professional organization

People 
 Sage (name), including a list of people with the surname or given name
 Sage the Gemini, (born; 1992) American rapper, born as Dominic Wynn Woods
 Sage (philosophy), in classical philosophy, is someone who has attained wisdom
 Wise old man, or sage, an archetype as described by Carl Jung

Places

Antarctica 
 Sage Nunataks

Canada 
 Sage (North Bay), Ontario

United States 
 Sage, Arkansas
 Sage, California
 Sage, Bethel, and Pleasant Hill, Texas
 Sage, Wyoming
 Sage River, in Michigan

Science and technology

Military equipment 
 Semi-Automatic Ground Environment, NORAD's radar coordination equipment
 SAGE radar stations
 USS Sage (AM-111), a World War II-era minesweeper

Software 
 Sage 300, enterprise management and accounting software
 Sage 50cloud, accounting software
 SageMath, formerly known as Sage, free mathematics software
 Sage (Mozilla Firefox extension)
 SAGE (game engine)

Other uses in science and technology 
 Serial analysis of gene expression, a molecular biology technique for measuring mRNA levels
 SAGE (Soviet–American Gallium Experiment), a radiochemical experiment in solar neutrino physics
 Stratospheric Aerosol and Gas Experiment, satellites used to study the chemical composition of earth's atmosphere
 Study on Global Ageing and Adult Health, a study run by the World Health Organization

Other uses
 Sage (color), a grey-green color resembling that of dried sage leaves

See also 

 Rishi or Sage, a Hindu term for an accomplished and enlightened person
 Lesage (disambiguation), including Le Sage
 Sagacity (disambiguation)
 Salvia (disambiguation)
 Seven Sages (disambiguation)
 Salvia yangii, Russian sage
 Phlomis, a genus known as Jerusalem sage
 Phlomis fruticosa, Jerusalem sage
 Artemisia (plant), a genus known as sagebrush
 Artemisia tridentata, sagebrush
 Eriogonum jamesii, antelope sage
 Leucophyllum frutescens, Texas sage or purple sage
 Coastal sage scrub, a low scrubland plant community